Torta de Santiago (in Galician) or Tarta de Santiago (in Spanish), literally meaning cake of St. James, is an almond cake or pie from Galicia with origin in the Middle Ages and the Camino de Santiago. The filling principally consists of ground almonds, eggs, and sugar, with additional flavouring of lemon zest, sweet wine, brandy, or grape marc, depending on the recipe used.

Background
The Galician for cake is tarta whilst it is often referred to torta, which is the Spanish word for it. It is a round shape and can be made with or without a base which can be either puff pastry or shortcrust pastry. 

The top of the pie is decorated with powdered sugar, masked by a silhouette of the Cross of Saint James (cruz de Santiago) which gives the pastry its name. The origin of the cross being decorated on the cake dates to 1924 when the "Casa Mora" began to adorn the almond cakes with the silhouette.

In May 2010, the EU gave Tarta de Santiago PGI status within Europe.  To qualify, the cake must be made in the Autonomous Community of Galicia and contain at least 33% almonds, excluding the base.

See also
 List of almond dishes

References

External links

Cakes
Galician cuisine
Sweet pies
Almond dishes
Spanish products with protected designation of origin
Santiago de Compostela
Spanish cuisine
Spanish desserts